The Scoresby Football Club is an Australian rules football club located in Scoresby, Victoria. They play in Division 3 of the Eastern Football League.

History

The club was a founding member of the Scoresby District Football Association in 1925 and went into recess when the competition ended in 1930. They reformed after World War II and won the 1947 Dandenong District Football Association B Grade premiership at their first attempt. They left the competition after the 1951 season.

In 1952 the club renamed itself Wantirna and moved to the Croydon-Ferntree Gully Football League which was the forerunner of the Eastern Football League. It reverted its name back to Scoresby in 1954 and has remained in the competition to this day.

References

History of the Scoresby Football Club

External links
 Official Eastern Football League website

Eastern Football League (Australia) clubs
Australian rules football clubs established in 1925
1925 establishments in Australia
Sport in the City of Knox